John Fassett Jr. (June 23, 1743—April 2, 1803) was an early white settler of Vermont who served in the military during the American Revolution and held several government positions during Vermont's early years, including Justice of the Vermont Supreme Court.

Biography
John Fassett Jr. was born in Bedford, Massachusetts on June 23, 1743.  His father, John Fassett (1720-1794), moved the family to Bennington, Vermont in 1764, where he farmed and owned an inn.  The elder John Fassett was a leader of early Vermont's military as a captain in the Green Mountain Boys and a member of the Vermont House of Representatives.

The younger John Fassett moved to Bennington with his father and became a farmer.  He was a lieutenant in the Green Mountain Boys militia regiment raised at the start of the American Revolution in 1775 and commanded by Seth Warner, and he took part in the attempted invasion of Canada in the fall of 1775.  He was a captain in the Continental Army regiment Warner raised in 1777, called Warner's Additional Regiment.  Fassett kept a diary during the Canada expedition, which was later published as Diary of Captain John Fassett, Jr. (1743-1803): When a First Lieutenant of "Green Mountain Boys," September 1st to December 7th, 1775.

During the Revolution Fassett also served with Thomas Chittenden and Matthew Lyon as a sequestration commissioner, the authorities charged with seizing the property of Loyalists and dispensing with it for the state's benefit.

Fassett was a justice of the Vermont Supreme Court from the time it was organized in 1778 until he moved to Cambridge in 1785.  He was a member of the governor's executive council from 1779 to 1785, and again from 1787 to 1795.

One of the original white settlers of Cambridge, which was originally in Chittenden County and is now part of Lamoille County, Fassett served as judge of the Chittenden County Court from 1787 to 1794.  In 1787, 1788, 1790 and 1791 he served in the Vermont House of Representatives.

Fassett died in Cambridge on April 2, 1803.  He was buried at Mountain View Cemetery in Cambridge.

References

External links
John Fassett, Jr. in Men of Vermont Illustrated.  Jacob G. Ullery.  1894.  Page 59.

1743 births
1803 deaths
People from Bedford, Massachusetts
People from Bennington, Vermont
People from Cambridge, Vermont
People of pre-statehood Vermont
Members of the Vermont House of Representatives
Vermont state court judges
Justices of the Vermont Supreme Court
People of Vermont in the American Revolution
Vermont militiamen in the American Revolution
Burials in Vermont